Sixth and Main is a 1977 American drama film directed by Christopher Cain and starring Leslie Nielsen and Beverly Garland.

Plot

Monica (Beverly Garland) decides to spend time in the slums of Los Angeles to absorb the atmosphere for a book she is planning to write.
She becomes interested in the tall, quiet derelict who calls himself John Doe (Leslie Nielsen), whose transient friends include an unlicensed doctor known as Doc (Leo Penn), a legless newsstand operator named Skateboard (Roddy McDowall), and the heroin addict and hooker Peanut (Gammy Burdett).
She trails John Doe to his home, a rundown trailer in a junkyard.
She decides to rehabilitate him.
She does not know that he was formerly a successful screenwriter.

Cast

Sixth and Main stars Leslie Nielsen as "John Doe", Roddy McDowall as "Skateboard", Leo Penn as "Doc", and Beverly Garland as "Monica Cord".
Other actors include Gammy Burdett, Joe Maross, Bill Erwin and Edwin Mills.

Production

Sixth and Main is a 104 minute color film that was released through National Cinema in September 1977.
Christopher Cain was writer, producer and director.

Critical reception

Variety (31 August 1977) described it as a "very professionally made low-budgeter... The film is earthy without being vulgar.
The Hollywood Reporter (31 August 1977) praised Chris Cain's skillful direction and Beverly Garland's acting, but said of the plot that it "waffles between wonderfully naturalistic scenes and whole passages filled with overwrought idealistic notions."

Citations

Sources

External links

1977 films
1970s English-language films
1977 drama films
American drama films
Films directed by Christopher Cain
1970s American films